The House Intelligence Subcommittee on Counterterrorism, Counterintelligence and Counterproliferation is one of the four subcommittees within the Permanent Select Committee on Intelligence through the 117th United States Congress. It is sometimes referred to as the "C3" subcommittee as a nickname. 

Prior to the 116th Congress, it was known as the Subcommittee on Emerging Threats.

Members, 117th Congress

References

External links 
 House Intelligence Committee Website

Intelligence Emerging Threats